Sakano (written: 坂野 or 阪野) is a Japanese surname. Notable people with the surname include:

, Japanese comedian
, Japanese modern pentathlete
, Japanese footballer
, Japanese ski jumper

Fictional characters
Mr. Sakano, a character from the manga series Gravitation

Japanese-language surnames